Kalypso Media Group is a German video game developer and publisher. Founded in 2006 in Worms, the group includes four companies, in Germany, the United Kingdom and the United States and has studios, Realmforge Studios, Gaming Minds Studios, Claymore Game Studios, and Nine Worlds Studios. Kalypso is best known for publishing Tropico, Sudden Strike, Dungeons and Railway Empire series.

History 
Kalypso Media was founded on 16 August 2006 by Simon Hellwig and Stefan Marcinek. One year later, a branch was opened in Bracknell, UK, and in June 2009, another in Ridgewood, USA. In 2009, the group opened its second UK outlet in the form of Kalypso Media Digital Ltd. in Leicester. Kalypso Media Digital Ltd. is responsible for the online marketing of its own games and the products of other providers.

In November 2008, it founded the subsidiary Realmforge Studios GmbH, based in Munich, and integrated Boxed Dreams, developer of Ceville. At the same time, it acquired the rights to the Tropico series from Take Two Interactive, with the first Kalypso-published game in the series being Tropico 3.

UK-based Ascaron filed for bankruptcy in April 2009. Kalypso was able to acquire rights to its series DarkStar One, Patrician and Port Royale in June 2009, though left other assets like the Sacred series with Ascaron. Kalypso also acquired fifteen former Ascaron employees to establish its second internal studio, Gaming Minds Studio, in Gütersloh, of which they held 60% ownership, the other 40% owned by Daniel Dumont and Kay Struve, former Ascaron employees that were named to run Gaming Minds.

In July 2010, Berlin manufacturer The Games Company (TGC) filed for bankruptcy and in September, Kalypso took over, acquiring several brands owned by the insolvent company. Kalypso also brought in TGC's internal studio Silver Style Entertainment and created a third internal studio, Noumena Studios in Berlin. The studio was rebranded as Skilltree Studios in 2014, but in March 2016, Kalypso opted to close the studio.

Kalypso founded a sister company for mobile gaming development, Kalypso Media Mobile, in April 2014 in Berlin. The studio’s first mobile and tablet games were released a year later in May 2015.

In January 2016, Stefan Marcinek sold his shares in the Kalypso and left the company, leaving Simon Hellwig as sole shareholder.

Kalypso acquired the Commandos, Imperial Glory, and Praetorians series from Pyro Studios in July 2018. Pyro, whose work has been more focused on supporting Ilion Animation Studios, welcomed Kalypso's opportunity to bring their titles back to the market. Kalypso later announced high-definition remasters of Commandos 2 and Praetorians for early 2020, and the formation of its third internal studio, Claymore Game Studios, to develop new games in the Commandos series. The company fully acquired the remaining ownership of Gaming Minds from Dumont and Struve in June 2020, with Dumont and Struve still remaining as the studio leads.

In October 2021, it announced a new studio in Munich called Nine Worlds Studios, which is named after the nine worlds of Norse mythology. They will be responsible for creating a new Tropico entry. Project Manager Thomas Schneider, formerly of Aesir Interactive, was hired to lead in setting up the studio.

On October 18, 2022, Kalypso announced that co-founder Simon Hellwig had passed away.

Subsidiaries 
Kalypso has several development studios:
 Realmforge Studios was established in Munich in November 2008, incorporating the team of Boxed Dreams who had developed Ceville. Realmforge oversees development on the series Dungeons and (since December 2020) Tropico
 Gaming Minds Studios was established in Gütersloh in June 2009, following the bankruptcy of Ascaron, incorporating fifteen Ascaron developers into the team. Gaming Minds develops games in the Railway Empire and Port Royale series.
 Claymore Game Studios was established in Darmstadt in December 2019, and is working on a new game in the Commandos series.
 Nine Worlds Studios was established in Munich in October 2021, with Thomas Schneider, formerly of Aesir Interactive, hired as project manager. They would begin work on Tropico 7.

Closed 
 In September 2010, Kalypso brought in The Games Company's (TGC) internal studio Silver Style Entertainment after TGC closed down in July 2010, and created a third internal studio, Noumena Studios in Berlin. The studio was rebranded as Skilltree Studios in 2014, but in March 2016, Kalypso opted to close the studio.

Games published

References

External links 

Companies based in Rhineland-Palatinate
German companies established in 2006
Privately held companies of Germany
Video game companies established in 2006
Video game companies of Germany
Video game development companies
Video game publishers
Worms, Germany